In mathematics, the ATS theorem is the theorem on the approximation of a
trigonometric sum by a shorter one. The application of the ATS theorem in certain problems of mathematical and theoretical physics can be very helpful.

History of the problem 

In  some fields of mathematics and mathematical physics, sums of the form

 

are under study.

argument, and 
Such sums appear, for example, in number theory in the analysis of the
Riemann zeta function, in the solution of problems connected with
integer points in the domains on plane and in space, in the study of the
Fourier series, and in the solution of such differential equations as the wave equation, the potential equation, the heat conductivity equation.

The problem of approximation of the series (1) by a suitable function was studied already by Euler and 
Poisson.

We shall define
the length of the sum 
to be the number   
(for the integers  and  this is the number of the summands in ).

the sum  can be
substituted with good accuracy by another sum 

 

where the length  is far less than 

First relations of the form

 

where   are the sums (1) and (2) respectively,  is
a remainder term, with concrete functions  and 
were obtained by G. H. Hardy and J. E. Littlewood,
when they
deduced approximate functional equation for the Riemann zeta function
 and by I. M. Vinogradov, in the study of
the amounts of integer points in the domains on plane.
In general form the theorem
was proved by J. Van der Corput, (on the recent
results connected with the Van der Corput theorem one can read at
).

In every one of the above-mentioned works,
some restrictions on the functions
With
convenient (for applications) restrictions on

Certain notations 

[1].     For 
or  the record

 
  means that there are the constants 
 and 
 such that

 

[2].    For a real number  the record  means that

 

where

 
is the fractional part of

ATS theorem 

Let the real functions ƒ(x) and  satisfy on the segment [a, b] the following conditions:

2) there exist numbers
  and  such that

 

and

 

Then, if we define the numbers  from the equation

 

we have

 

where

 

 

 

 

The most simple variant of the formulated theorem is the statement, which is called in the literature the Van der Corput lemma.

Van der Corput lemma 

Let  be a real differentiable function in the interval  moreover, inside of this interval, its derivative  is a monotonic and a sign-preserving function, and for the constant  such that  satisfies the inequality  Then

 

where

Remark

 

where 

On the applications of ATS to the problems of physics see,; see also,.

Notes

Theorems in analysis